Chris Valasek is a computer security researcher with Cruise Automation, a self-driving car startup owned by GM, and best known for his work in automotive security research. Prior to his current employment, he worked for IOActive, Coverity, Accuvant, and IBM . Valasek holds a Bachelors in Computer Science from University of Pittsburgh. He currently lives in Pittsburgh, Pennsylvania.

Valasek has publicly demonstrated many security vulnerabilities, with particular focus on Microsoft Windows heap exploitation. His 2009 presentation "Practical Windows XP/2003 Heap Exploitation" at BlackHat presented a novel approach to gaining elevated access in a Windows environment. Later research, such as his 2010 paper "Understanding the Low Fragmentation Heap: From Allocation to Exploitation" demonstrated ways to circumvent vendor mitigations to the approaches outlined in his prior work.

In 2013, he and Charlie Miller demonstrating a number of attack vectors against ECUs in automotive control networks.  Together with Miller, they have produced a survey of remote attack surfaces in then-current model year automobiles, an important first step in establishing the state of the art of automotive security and safety research.

References

https://www.usatoday.com/story/tech/talkingtech/2017/07/31/gms-self-driving-car-unit-cruise-hires-famous-car-hackers/525651001/

External links 
 
 

Living people
University of Pittsburgh alumni
People associated with computer security
1982 births